Lexicon Branding, Inc., is an American marketing firm founded in 1982 by David Placek. It focuses on selecting brand names for companies and products. The company devised the brand names Pentium, BlackBerry, PowerBook, Zune, Swiffer, Febreze, Subaru Outback and Forester, Toyota Scion, DeskJet, Dasani, OnStar, Embassy Suites Hotels and Metreon, among others.

History
David Placek founded Lexicon in 1982. Placek grew up in Santa Rosa, California, and graduated from UCLA with a degree in political science. He cites his work as press secretary in Warren Hearnes's unsuccessful 1976 campaign for U.S. Senate from Missouri as the experience that inspired him to go into marketing. Before starting Lexicon, he worked at the advertising agencies, Foote, Cone & Belding (where he became a devotee of Synectics) and an agency called S&O.

As of October 1992, Lexicon had eight employees. As of February 1998, it had 15 employees and did about 60% of its business in the technology sector. An April 2004 article described the company as having 17 employees but said the "core creative team" was Placek and three others. As of November 2008, Lexicon had 26 employees.

As of June 2010 the company was headquartered in Sausalito, California, and had offices in London and New York City.

Clients
Apple Inc. introduced its PowerBook in 1991. Lexicon crafted the name to combine the notions of performance ("Power") and portability ("Book"). That same year, Lexicon came up with the name of Apple's Macintosh Quadra desktop computer, hoping to appeal to engineers with a name evoking technical terms like quadrant and quadriceps.

In 1992, Intel was preparing to launch its fifth-generation x86-compatible microchip and needed a name it could trademark. Lexicon suggested it should end with the suffix -ium to connote a fundamental ingredient of a computer, like a chemical element. On a list of such names was "Pentium", which stood out to Placek because the prefix pent- could refer to the fifth generation of x86. Lexicon conducted market research and found that consumers would expect a hypothetical "Porsche Pentium" to be Porsche's highest-end car. In 1998, Placek said Pentium was the best name his company had come up with. The name was so successful that Intel named the chip's x86 successors after it: Pentium II, Pentium III, and so on. Intel CEO Andy Grove said that Pentium became a more recognized brand than Intel itself and told The New Yorker in 2011 that the name "was one of our great success stories."

In 1997, Sony's retail division hired Lexicon to name the first location, to be in downtown San Francisco, of a newly planned chain of "urban entertainment centers" designed to promote the Sony brand. Lexicon chose the name Metreon because they believed the metr- suffix evoked words like "metropolitan" and "meteor", the latter "suggesting something sophisticated, exciting and fast-moving".

Intel hired Lexicon again in 1998 to name the Celeron and Xeon chips. The San Jose Mercury News described Lexicon's reasoning behind the former name: "Celer is Latin for swift. As in 'accelerate.' And 'on.' As in 'turned on.' Celeron is seven letters and three syllables, like Pentium. The 'Cel' of Celeron rhymes with 'tel' of Intel." Placek told the San Francisco Chronicle said that the "X" of "Xeon" evokes "the next generation", "eon" refers to the long period of time, and the novelty of the name as a whole reflects the product's novelty. It also was supposed to recall "Pentium's Greek roots".

In 1998, Lexicon came up with a new name for the company then known as Borland International: Inprise. Borland CEO Del Yocam explained at the time that the new name was meant to evoke "integrating the enterprise". Analysts said Borland proved to be a stronger brand, and by 2000 the company had switched the name back.

Research In Motion hired Lexicon in 1998 to name their new two-way pager. RIM came with several ideas, including EasyMail, MegaMail, and ProMail. Based on interviews with San Francisco Bay Area commuters, Lexicon determined that referring to e-mail in the name would induce stress in users. Encouraging RIM to choose a name that larger competitors would never think of, Lexicon proposed BlackBerry. The second B was capitalized because a linguistic study funded by Lexicon suggested that the letter "B" is, in The New Yorkers words, "one of the most 'reliable' in any language". Lexicon research also suggested that repetition of the B would promote relaxation in users.

In 2006, Microsoft approached Lexicon to find a name for its new portable media player to compete with Apple's iPod. Placek assigned three teams to come up with three names: one for the Microsoft player, one for a hypothetical Sony player, one for "a broadband experience for MTV." He refused to tell the San Francisco Chronicle which team came up with "Zune", the name Microsoft chose. Placek said the name was chosen because the "Z" was perceived as fun and irreverent, it has one syllable compared with iPod's two, and it has a musical sound that rhymes with iTunes, Apple's media distribution platform. Controversies arose due to similarities between the name and vulgar words in Hebrew and Canadian French. In 2008, Lexicon came up with the name of Microsoft's Azure Services Platform.

Lexicon also christened Subaru's Outback and Forester vehicles, Procter & Gamble's Swiffer cleaner, Levi Strauss & Co.'s Slates dress pants, the Oldsmobile Alero, Embassy Suites Hotels, Hewlett-Packard's DeskJet printer line, Nestlé's Dibs confection, Colgate's Wisp miniature toothbrush, the Coca-Cola Company's Dasani bottled water, the Toyota Scion, P&G's Febreze odor eliminator, and OnStar.

References

External links
 Company website

Public relations companies of the United States
Marketing companies established in 1982
Privately held companies based in California
Companies based in Marin County, California
1982 establishments in California